Dr. Pritam Ram (born 1 July 1959) is an MLA in Chhattisgarh from The Indian National Congress.

Political career
He has been the president of District Medical Administrators Association and a member of Indian Medical Association, Ambikapur Branch.

He became an MLA in Chhattisgarh for the first time from Samri (Vidhan Sabha constituency) in 2013.

See also
Chhattisgarh Legislative Assembly
2013 Chhattisgarh Legislative Assembly election

References

External links

Indian National Congress politicians from Chhattisgarh
1959 births
Living people